The Best of M People is the first greatest hits album by English dance music band M People, released in 1998. The album contains seventeen tracks, including ten UK top 10 hits and three new songs: "Testify", "Dreaming" (which both reached the UK top 20) and a cover version of The Doobie Brothers' "What a Fool Believes". A limited edition was released, including a bonus live album with eight tracks recorded at the Later... with Jools Holland M People special, plus enhanced content. The album is now available in the United States through iTunes.

There was also an advanced sampler called Classic and a promotional version containing the same content as the bonus live disc but with more sound excerpts and full videos.

Track listing

Original version

Classic version

Charts

Weekly charts

Year-end charts

Certifications

References

M People compilation albums
1998 greatest hits albums